Kalervo Rauhala (October 19, 1930, Ylistaro – September 21, 2016) was a Finnish wrestler and Olympic medalist in Greco-Roman wrestling.

Olympics
Rauhala competed at the 1952 Summer Olympics in Helsinki where he received a silver medal in Greco-Roman wrestling, the middleweight class.

References

1930 births
2016 deaths
People from Seinäjoki
Finnish male sport wrestlers
Olympic wrestlers of Finland
Wrestlers at the 1952 Summer Olympics
Olympic silver medalists for Finland
Olympic medalists in wrestling
Medalists at the 1952 Summer Olympics
Sportspeople from South Ostrobothnia